Schirinzi is an Italian surname. Notable people with the surname include: 

 Enrico Schirinzi (born 1984), Italian footballer
 Tino Schirinzi (1934–1993), Italian actor and stage director

Italian-language surnames
Surnames of Italian origin